SEG Racing Academy is a Dutch UCI Continental team founded in 2015 that participates in UCI Continental Circuits races.

Team roster

Major wins

2015
Stage 3 Le Triptyque des Monts et Châteaux, Steven Lammertink
Arno Wallaard Memorial, Jasper Bovenhuis
Stage 4 Tour de Bretagne, Alex Peters
Overall Tour de Berlin, Steven Lammertink
Stage 2 (ITT), Steven Lammertink
Stage 5 Giro della Valle d'Aosta, Koen Bouwman
2016
Stage 7 Tour de Bretagne, Nick Schultz
Slag om Norg, Fabio Jakobsen
2018
Stage 5 Tour de Normandie, Julius van den Berg
Stage 5 Tour de Bretagne, Cees Bol
Stage 6 Tour de Bretagne, Julius van den Berg
Ronde van Noord-Holland, Julius van den Berg
Overall Ronde de l'Isard, Stephen Williams
Stages 1 & 2, Stephen Williams
Prologue Giro Ciclistico d'Italia, Edoardo Affini
Midden–Brabant Poort Omloop, Julius van den Berg
Stage 7 Giro Ciclistico d'Italia, Stephen Williams
Gooikse Pijl, Jordi Meeus
Paris–Tours Espoirs, Marten Kooistra
2019
Stage 2 Tour de Normandie, Alberto Dainese
Stage 5 Tour de Normandie, Barnabás Peák
Stages 1 & 3 Le Triptyque des Monts et Châteaux, Kaden Groves
Stages 1 & 4 Circuit des Ardennes, Kaden Groves
Stages 2, 3 & 6 Tour de Bretagne, Alberto Dainese
Entre Brenne et Montmorillonnais, Alberto Dainese
Stage 1 Ronde de l'Isard, Kaden Groves
Stage 1 Giro della Valle d'Aosta, Ide Schelling
Stage 3 Czech Cycling Tour, Alberto Dainese
2020
Ster van Zwolle, David Dekker
Dorpenomloop Rucphen, David Dekker
Stages 2 & 3 Czech Cycling Tour, Jordi Meeus
Stage 6 Giro Ciclistico d'Italia, Jordi Meeus
Stage 1 Ronde de l'Isard, Wessel Krul
2021
 Young rider classification International Tour of Rhodes, Stan Van Tricht

National champions
2015
 Netherlands U23 Time Trial, Steven Lammertink

2016
 Netherlands U23 Road Race, Fabio Jakobsen

2017
 Netherlands U23 Time Trial, Julius van den Berg
 Netherlands U23 Road Race, Fabio Jakobsen

2018
 European U23 Time Trial, Edoardo Affini

2019
 Netherlands U23 Time Trial, Daan Hoole

2020
 Belgium U23 Road Race, Jordi Meeus

References

External links

UCI Continental Teams (Europe)
Cycling teams based in the Netherlands
Cycling teams established in 2015
2015 establishments in the Netherlands